Bluff Siding or Atlanta Station is an unincorporated community located in the town of Buffalo, in Buffalo County, Wisconsin, United States.

Bluff Siding, a siding on the Chicago and North Western Railway, was named from rocky bluffs near the town site.

Education
Bluff Siding is part of the Cochrane-Fountain City School District.

Transportation
Bluff Siding, Wisconsin is located northeast of Winona, Minnesota on Wisconsin Highway 35 and Wisconsin Highway 54 on the Great River Road. Bluff Siding is 2.2 miles from Winona, Minnesota.

Notable people
Steve Drazkowski, Minnesota politician, grew up on a farm in Bluff Siding.

Images

Notes

Unincorporated communities in Wisconsin
Unincorporated communities in Buffalo County, Wisconsin